Robert Dugald Caldwell Stewart (2 December 1907 – 25 August 1967) was a Progressive Conservative party member of the House of Commons of Canada. He was born in Dalhousie, New Brunswick and became a lawyer by career.

He was first elected at the Charlotte riding in the 1958 general election. Stewart served for one term, the 24th Canadian Parliament, then was defeated at Charlotte in the 1962 election. He was also unsuccessful in regaining the riding in the 1965 election.

Stewart first campaigned for federal office in the 1935 election at Nova Scotia's Digby—Annapolis—Kings riding for the Conservative Party.

References

External links
 

1907 births
1967 deaths
Members of the House of Commons of Canada from New Brunswick
Progressive Conservative Party of Canada MPs
Lawyers in New Brunswick
20th-century Canadian lawyers